Jesse Merrill Blanchard (April 26, 1881 – April 3, 1914) was an American football player, coach of football, basketball, and baseball, and college athletics administrator.  He served as the head football coach at the College of William & Mary (1904–1905, 1910), Washington University in St. Louis (1906–1907), and Whitman College (1908–1909).

Playing career
Blanchard played college football as a quarterback at Bowdoin College.

Coaching career
Blanchard was the first head coach of the William & Mary Tribe men's basketball team, in 1905–06. In the inaugural season of William & Mary's basketball program, Blanchard led the team to a 4–1 record. It was his first and last season with the Tribe despite the success.  Blanchard also coached the William & Mary football team from 1904 to 1905 and again in 1910, compiling a record of 6–14–2.

Head coaching record

Football

Basketball

References

External links
 

1881 births
1914 deaths
American football quarterbacks
Basketball coaches from Maine
Coaches of American football from Maine
Bowdoin Polar Bears football players
People from Winterport, Maine
Players of American football from Maine
Washington University Bears football coaches
Washington University Bears men's basketball coaches
Whitman Fighting Missionaries football coaches
William & Mary Tribe athletic directors
William & Mary Tribe baseball coaches
William & Mary Tribe football coaches
William & Mary Tribe men's basketball coaches